Otto the Orange is the mascot for the Syracuse Orange, the athletic teams of Syracuse University in Syracuse, New York, USA. Otto is an anthropomorphism of the citrus fruit, wearing a large blue hat and blue pants. Otto can often be seen at Syracuse sporting events in the JMA Wireless Dome and other venues.

Mascot history

Saltine Warrior
The Syracuse mascot was originally a Native American character named "The Saltine Warrior" (Syracuse's unofficial nickname is the Salt City) and "Big Chief Bill Orange". The character was born out of a hoax in which it was claimed that a 16th-century Onondaga chief was unearthed while digging the foundation for the women's gymnasium in 1928.

In the mid-1950s, the father of a Lambda Chi Alpha fraternity brother owned a cheerleading camp. He made a Saltine Warrior costume for his son to wear at SU football games. Thus began a nearly forty-year tradition of Lambda Chi brothers serving as SU's mascot. In 1990 however the University opened up the mascot traditions to the entire student body (Daily Orange, February 22, 1990).

In December 1977, Native American students successfully petitioned the University to discontinue the Saltine Warrior, citing the mascot's stereotypical portrayal of Native Americans. The mascot was discontinued in 1978. During the 1978 season, the University introduced a Roman gladiator dressed in orange armor, but the idea proved largely unpopular among fans, who regularly booed the mascot.

Otto becomes official
In the 1980s, a new Syracuse University mascot emerged and was described as a "juiced-up, bumbling citrus fruit from which two legs protrude", and quickly became popular on campus. Then, the mascot was simply known as "the Orange". In the summer of 1990, the cheerleaders and mascots were at Cheerleading Camp in Tennessee and the students who were chosen to suit up in the costume narrowed the field down to two potential names — "Opie" and "Otto" — as a new orange costume was made.  It was concluded that the name "Opie" would lead to the inevitable rhyme with 'dopey', and settled on "Otto." Later that fall, word got out that the cheerleaders were calling the latest mascot costume Otto, and the name stuck.

For 17 years the university did not settle on an "official" mascot until the chancellor appointed a group of students and faculty to create a mascot and logo. University administration considered introducing a new mascot (a wolf or lion were likely candidates), but the student body supported Otto. He was recognized as the official mascot of Syracuse University in December 1995 by Chancellor Buzz Shaw.

In 2016, Otto was named in the top-10 mascots in college football by Sports Illustrated.

Mascot team 
There are a team of performers that dress as Otto; this team contains a mix of personalities and genders. Similar body builds are required so not one Otto stands out; performers need to be the desired height of 5 feet and 10 inches. Stunts, dances, gestures and general movement are all practiced and routinized. The Ottos take turns attending events. Otto will never be in two places at once, preserving the magic of the mascot; if there are two sporting events happening at the same time, Otto's appearances will be split between the two events.

Social media
In general, most of Otto’s social media activity happens through pictures and videos. Additionally, he frequently retweets or shares other University pages in order to promote sports games, events such as the career fair, and instilling pride in SU fans. In 2006, a video of a fight between Otto the Orange and the Hokiebird was spread, with many speculating that the fight was the result of pent up anger between the two actors portraying the characters. It was not until 2019 that the person who portrayed Otto at the time confirmed that this was a simulated fight.

References

Atlantic Coast Conference mascots
Syracuse Orange